The New Werner was a motorcycle produced by Werner Motors beginning in 1901.  It replaced Werner's 1897 model, whose motor placed above the front wheel caused handling problems. Production ceased in 1908. Some 50, now known as the "Leitner Rossiya Motorcycle", were also produced under license in Russia with Fafnir engines at the Riga bicycle works.

The New Werner's lasting innovation was to place the engine at the lowest point in a bicycle-style diamond frame, where a bicycle crank would have been (the bicycle pedals, crank and redundant chain were relocated rearward and retained for starting and hillclimbing assistance). The pattern of low-mounted engine inside some kind of motorcycle frame became the standard motorcycle layout for the 20th century.

The intake valve was automatic (actuated by atmospheric pressure) and the exhaust valve was cam driven.

At , it was the fastest production motorcycle from the time it was introduced until the 1911 model year FN Four was introduced.

The New Werner was selected by Cycle World's Kevin Cameron as the most influential motorcycle of all time.  It was shown in the Guggenheim Museum's 2001–2003 The Art of the Motorcycle exhibition in Las Vegas.

Notes

References

See also
List of motorcycles of 1900 to 1909

External links

Werner 1903, Yesterday's Antique Motorcycles (Nederweert, the Netherlands)

 

 
 

Motorcycles of France
Motorcycles introduced in the 1900s
Vehicles introduced in 1901